Jenson Tyler "J. T." Brooksby (born October 26, 2000) is an American professional tennis player. He reached a career-high singles ranking of world No. 33 on 13 June 2022.

Collegiate career
Brooksby enrolled at Baylor University to play college tennis, but turned pro after he redshirted his freshman season due to injury.

Professional career

2018: Grand Slam debut

On August 12, 2018, Brooksby defeated Brandon Nakashima to win the USTA Boys' under-18 national championship. This victory earned him a wild card into the main draw of the US Open. He lost in the first round to eventual quarterfinalist John Millman.

2019: US Open second round
On August 23, 2019, Brooksby qualified for the main draw of the US Open, where he defeated Tomáš Berdych in four sets in the first round. However, in the second round, Brooksby went down in a four-set match to 17th seed Nikoloz Basilashvili of Georgia.

2021: First ATP final, US Open fourth round, Top 60 debut
In 2021, Brooksby won three Challenger trophies, at Potchefstroom-2, Orlando-1, and Tallahassee. He made his debut in the top 150 by reaching a then career high of world No. 149 on June 14, 2021.

He also reached his first ATP tour final at the 2021 Hall of Fame Open in Newport, defeating Evgeny Donskoy, Denis Kudla, Peter Gojowczyk, and 7th seed Jordan Thompson. He became the second-youngest player to reach the final in the 45-year tournament history on Newport's grass courts. He lost to 8th seed Kevin Anderson in the final. This result brought Brooksby up to a new career high of No. 126 on July 19, 2021.

At the 2021 Citi Open, Brooksby upset 2nd seed and 15th ranked Félix Auger-Aliassime to earn his first top 50 (and top 20) win and advance into his first ATP 500 level quarterfinal. He beat John Millman to advance to his first ATP 500 semifinal, where he lost to 5th seed (and eventual champion) Jannik Sinner. As a result of this run, Brooksby entered the top 100 for the first time, becoming world No. 99 on August 9, 2021.

The following week at the 2021 National Bank Open, Brooksby made his debut at ATP 1000 level but lost in the first round to Nikoloz Basilashvili.

Brooksby then received a singles wildcard into the US Open. He reached the fourth round of a Major for the first time, defeating Mikael Ymer, compatriot Taylor Fritz, and 21st seed Aslan Karatsev. Brooksby, aged 20, became the youngest American to reach the US Open fourth round since a then 20-year-old Andy Roddick did so in 2002. Brooksby defeated Karatsev in the 31st five-setter of the tournament – tied with 2015 Wimbledon for most at a Grand Slam event, since 34 at the 2004 US Open. He then lost to world No. 1 Novak Djokovic in four sets.

As a qualifier at the 2021 European Open, Brooksby reached the semifinals where he lost to Diego Schwartzman. As a result he reached a new career-high ranking of No. 59 on October 25, 2021.

Brooksby qualified for the 2021 Next Generation ATP Finals but did not play due to injury.

2022: Two finals, Major third round, Two Masters fourth rounds, first Top-5 win, Top 35
At the 2022 Dallas Open, Brooksby made his second ATP final where he lost to Reilly Opelka. As a result, he moved into the top 50 for the first time at world No. 45 on 14 February 2022.

At the 2022 BNP Paribas Open, Brooksby reached the fourth round of a Masters 1000 for the first time in his career, defeating World No. 5 Stefanos Tsitsipas for his first top 10 win. He repeated the feat at the 2022 Miami Open reaching the fourth round in his consecutive Masters 1000 where he lost to the top seed and World No. 2 Daniil Medvedev.

He reached a career-high of No. 34 on 16 May 2022 after a third round showing at the Masters 1000 in Rome.

On his debut, he reached the third round of the 2022 Wimbledon Championships for the first time at this Major where he lost to Christian Garin.

Seeded 6th at the 2022 Atlanta Open, he reached the second round after defeating Benoît Paire in straight sets. Next he defeated Mackenzie McDonald in straight sets to reach the quarterfinals. He then reached the semifinals after defeating 6-time champion and No. 2 seed John Isner, who saved four match points in the third set. He then advanced to the finals after defeating Frances Tiafoe. He lost to 2019 champion Alex de Minaur in straight sets.

2023: Australian Open debut and third round, first Top-3 win
On his debut at the 2023 Australian Open, he reached the third round defeating second seed and world No. 3 Casper Ruud for his first top-3 win.

Playing style
Brooksby is a  defensive baseliner, who specialises in winning baseline rallies and employs a counterpunching style of play frequently. 

Brooksby’s unique playing style and shot mechanics has been called "unorthodox" by his peers. His game is built on his movement and redirection of the ball. He has short take backs on his groundstrokes so he can disguise his shots on both sides. His serve is widely considered to be his greatest weakness, despite his height. He also has a high rally tolerance, able to outlast and grind down his opponents in long rallies.

Performance timeline

Singles
Current through the 2023 Australian Open.

ATP career finals

Singles: 3 (3 runner-ups)

ATP Challenger and ITF Futures finals

Singles: 7 (6–1)

Record against other players

Record against top 10 players
Brooksby's record against players who have been ranked in the top 10, with those who are active in boldface. Only ATP Tour main draw matches are considered:

Wins over top 10 players
He has a  record against players who were, at the time the match was played, ranked in the top 10.

*

Notes

References

External links

 
 

American male tennis players
Sportspeople from Sacramento, California
Living people
2000 births
Baylor Bears men's tennis players
Tennis people from California
21st-century American people